The Tesla Cyberquad is an upcoming electric quad bike all-terrain vehicle (ATV) concept presented by Tesla, Inc., at the Tesla Cybertruck's November 2019 unveiling. Concluding the presentation at the company's design studio in Hawthorne, California, Elon Musk announced "one more thing", at which point the ATV was shown being loaded onto the back of the Cybertruck. Observers have pointed to elements seen at the unveiling indicating that the Cyberquad prototype had been built by swapping the powerplant and plastics on a Yamaha Raptor. Certain images from the rear suggest the vehicle also appears to have a powertrain borrowed from Zero Motorcycles. 

The ATV was mentioned in the specifications for the Cybertruck; the Cybertruck was described as having "space for your toolbox, tire and Cyberquad, with room to spare". One day later, Musk tweeted, "Tesla 2 person electric ATV will come at first as an option for Cybertruck." There was no mention of pricing. 

The trademark "Cyberquad" was registered in November 2019. During Tesla's 2020 Battery Day Event, Musk brought a prototype of the Cyberquad for investors. He announced that the Cyberquad would be available as an optional accessory for the Cybertruck in late 2021. Musk mentioned the Cyberquad again at the 2021 shareholder meeting in October, but he did not provide any further details on the production start. The ATV will most likely not enter production before the Cybertruck RWD starts production in late 2023.

Charging 
The ATV can charge in the bed of the Tesla Cybertruck from its 120 or 240 volt charging system.

Cyberquad for Kids
During Cyber week at the start of December 2021 Tesla released a scaled-down Cyberquad for Kids mini-ATV designed for children. Product purchase was only available to those with an existing Tesla purchase or reservation and initial production sold out on the first day, before being opened up again. Cyberquad for Kids was the third Tesla product produced by Radio Flyer for Tesla. There are two speed settings, one for 5 mph (8 km/h) and one for 10 mph (16 km/h). On October 27th, 2022, the Cybertruck for Kids has been recalled by the U.S. Consumer Product Safety Commission.

See also
 Nikola Zero, all-electric battery-powered off-road sport UTV

References

External links 
 
 Cyberquad for Kids, at Tesla

ATVs
Battery electric vehicles
Cyberquad